The String Quintet in E major, Op. 97, B. 180, was composed by Antonín Dvořák during the summer he spent in Spillville, Iowa in 1893.  It is a "Viola Quintet" in that it is scored for string quartet with an extra viola.  It was completed in just over a month, immediately after he wrote his American String Quartet.  Like the Quartet, the Quintet finely captures the inflection of Dvořák's Bohemian idiom with American inspirations. The  Quintet was premiered by the Kneisel Quartet in New York on 13 January 1894 along with the second performance of the Quartet and very favorably reviewed, as comparable to Mozart. The reviewer noted that the Quintet was "of the kind about which a commentator may write a small volume without exhausting his admiration or fully describing their beauties".

In an extensive analysis for the Chamber Music Society of Lincoln Center, Bruce Adolphe shows the influence of pentatonic scales on the Quintet, suggests that the unusual percussive opening of the Scherzo (second movement) may relate to tribal music that Dvořák heard in Spillville, as well as noting that the theme of the third movement may be related to Dvořák's known interest in creating a new American national anthem.

The string quintet consists of four movements:

References

External links

 Performance of String Quintet No. 3 by the Musicians of Marlboro from the Isabella Stewart Gardner Museum in MP3 format

String quintets by Antonín Dvořák
1893 compositions
Compositions in E-flat major